Pockmark  may refer to:

Acne scarring—resulting from acne or infections such as chicken pox
 The scarring of smallpox
Pockmark (geology)—a geological formation

See also
 Pimple

pt:Pockmark